Barriobusto (Gorrebusto in Basque) is a town located in the municipality of Oyón-Oion, in the province of Álava (Araba), in the autonomous community of Basque Country, northern Spain.

In March 1977, Labraza and Barriobusto were incorporated in the municipality of Oyón-Oion.

External links
 BARRIOBUSTO in the Bernardo Estornés Lasa - Auñamendi Encyclopedia (Euskomedia Fundazioa) 

Towns in Álava